Koval Distillery is a craft distillery located in Chicago, Illinois (established in 2008). It is the first distillery within Chicago's city limits since Prohibition. Koval's founders, Robert and Sonat Birnecker, left academic careers to found the distillery, aiming to bring the distilling traditions and techniques of Robert’s Austrian grandfather to America. Certified both organic and kosher, Koval creates award-winning whiskeys, brandies, and liqueurs in their distillery in the Andersonville neighborhood of Chicago's Northside. The distillery is kosher. Koval (Yiddish for blacksmith) was founded by Robert and Sonat Birnecker.

Spirits
Koval produces a variety of whiskeys, vodkas, brandies and liqueurs. Of particular note is Koval Bierbrand, a spirit distilled from lager in cooperation originally with Metropolitan Brewing and later with Goose Island Brewery.

Awards
 2017 Illinois Small Business Persons of the Year
Illinois Exporter of the Year 2016

References

External links 
 Koval Distillery (official site)

Food and drink companies based in Chicago
Manufacturing companies based in Chicago
Distilleries in Illinois